Jul, jul, strålande jul may refer to:

"Jul, jul, strålande jul", Swedish Christmas song
Jul, jul, strålande jul (Artur Erikson & Anna-Lena Löfgren album), 1969
Jul, jul, strålande jul (Nils Börge Gårdh album), 2001
Jul, jul, strålande jul (Ingvar Wixell album), 1964